Sea Life Melbourne Aquarium is a Southern Ocean and Antarctic aquarium in central Melbourne, Australia. It is located on the banks of the Yarra River beside and under the Flinders Street Viaduct and the King Street Bridge. The attraction is a Sea Life Centre owned by Merlin Entertainments.

History

The current building was built between February 1998 and December 1999, the building was designed by Peddle Thorp architects to resemble a ship moored to the river, and opened in January 2000. At its centre is a world first  'oceanarium in the round' where the spectators become the spectacle to the marine life swimming around them.

Soon after opening, the building had a legionnaires disease outbreak that resulted in 4 deaths and another 125 people being infected. Those affected had visited the aquarium between 11 and 27 April 2000. A damages action was brought in May 2000, ending in February 2004.

On 28 November 2008 Melbourne Aquarium officially reopened after a significant expansion, also designed by Peddle Thorp, and now extends from the Yarra River to Flinders Street. A new entrance was built on the corner of Flinders and King Streets. The expansion features exhibits with king penguins and gentoo penguins, as well as many Antarctic fish, a first for Australia. The exhibits also feature real ice and snow to simulate Antarctic conditions, and take visitors on an expedition to Antarctica. The penguins were sourced from Kelly Tarlton's Underwater World in New Zealand.

In April 2013, Melbourne Aquarium's owners, Merlin Entertainments, announced that they would be spending $8 million on the refurbishment of the facilities. As part of the process, the aquarium was rebranded as a Sea Life Centre and relaunched in September 2013.

The current Aquarium succeeded an earlier site in the Eastern annex of the Royal Exhibition Building, which burned down in 1953.

Features
The Aquarium has a one-way self-guided tour, which is spread over four levels:

Level One
Rainforest Adventure
Crocodile's Lair
Wetlands Recovery Nursery

Ground Floor
Penguin Playground
Mangroves and Rockpools
Coral Atoll (currently under re-development)
The Bay
Seahorse Pier
Coral Cafe
Conservation Cove
Crocodile's Lair
Aquarium Shop

Level B1
Ocean Invaders

Level B2
Mermaid Garden
Shipwreck Explorer
Ocean Discovery

The aquarium is known for its main exhibit, the 2.2 million litre Mermaid Garden oceanarium, which features a grey nurse shark and sandbar whaler sharks, along with up to 2,000 marine creatures of diverse species.

Research and conservation
Sea Life Melbourne Aquarium conducts extensive research into marine species, with the Aquarium's conservation efforts overseen by the Turtle Rehabilitation and Conservation of Keystone Species (T.R.A.C.K.S.) group, a subsidiary of the Sea Life Conservation Trust.

Grey nurse sharks. Sea Life Melbourne Aquarium is involved in a grey nurse shark breeding program in conjunction with Sea Life Manly Aquarium, aimed at conserving this endangered species, which is already extinct in Victoria. The Aquarium currently has one grey nurse shark and the program is looking at intra vitro fertilisation (IVF) as a method of breeding. 
Bamboo sharks. Sea Life Melbourne Aquarium is home to the first-ever in-vitro fertilised (IVF) shark in existence. The brown-banded bamboo shark pup was born on 3 March 2014, ending a process which began in September when aquarists collected a semen sample from a shark in Mooloolaba in northeastern Australia.
Sea turtles. The aquarium is also involved in the rehabilitation of turtles washed south into the colder Victorian waters where they cannot survive. The sea turtles are housed at the aquarium to gain strength, at which point they are taken north to Queensland to be released.
Seadragons. Melbourne Aquarium is one of few worldwide to have successfully bred the locally-endemic weedy seadragon in captivity.
Spotted Handfish. Sealife Melbourne Aquarium and its has been the first facility to successfully sex and breed the Tasmanian spotted handfish in captivity. 

Purple Spotted Gudgeon. The rainforest area has opened a facility to captively breed the Southern Purple Spotted Gudgeon.

Past attractions
Sea Life Melbourne Aquarium formerly had a giant squid exhibit (frozen, not alive), which was moved to UnderWater World in Queensland. The Aquarium was also home to angler fish, the Japanese spider crab, jellyfish, blood sucking leeches, horseshoe crabs, venomous scorpions and tarantulas.

Ownership
In 2012, Merlin Entertainments, the global owner and operator of the Sea Life Centres brand as well as iconic brands such as Legoland and Madame Tussauds, purchased the Living and Leisure Group, then the owner-operators of the Melbourne Aquarium.

In late 2013, after an extensive $8 million investment and redevelopment by Merlin Entertainments, the aquarium relaunched under the Sea Life brand, joining up to 100 Merlin-owned attractions worldwide.

Gallery

References

External links

Sea Life Centres
Tourist attractions in Melbourne
Aquaria in Australia
2000 establishments in Australia
Buildings and structures in Melbourne City Centre